Aberystwyth Lifeboat Station is a Royal National Lifeboat Institution (RNLI) lifeboat station in the coastal resort of Aberystwyth, Ceredigion, West Wales. It was established in 1861, but there has been a lifeboat serving the town since 1843.

Since 2007 the station has operated an  inshore lifeboat, RNLB Spirit of Friendship (B-822), launched by submersible tractor.

The station also has an Arancia IRB as support for the larger Atlantic 85-class inshore lifeboat.

History
The first lifeboat at Aberystwyth was a 27 ft, 6-oared boat funded by public subscription in 1843 and under the control of the harbour master. In 1861 the RNLI took over the service, completing a chain of RNLI stations along the coast of Cardigan Bay from Strumble Head to the Llŷn Peninsula.

The 10-oared Evelyn Wood was the first RNLI lifeboat.

A severe gale on 29 December 1900 saw Coxswain David Williams launch the lifeboat to a fishing smack; in heavy seas three lifeboatmen (Jack Williams, Tom Jones and J.C. Rea) were thrown overboard but were rescued by their fellow crewmen. Despite the loss of most of their oars, they managed to beach the lifeboat and hold it until the tide ebbed. In the meantime the fishermen, whose boat was wrecked on the rocks, made it safely to shore.

In February 1946 Frederick Angus was at sea for more than 24 hours in severe weather standing by the broken-down submarine  and helping to rescue her crew.

In 1964 Aberystwyth was the first RNLI lifeboat station to change from offshore to solely inshore lifeboats.

The Arancia IRB was established in Aberystwyth in 2013 and was dedicated in Holy Trinity Church, it is believed to be the first and only lifeboat to be dedicated within a church.

Fleet

Aberystwyth has been served by a number of lifeboats in its more than 150 years of operation by the RNLI and more than 170 years in total.

All Weather lifeboats (ALBs)

Inshore lifeboats (ILBs)

Launching Vehicles

Awards
A number of awards have been made to recognise exemplary service to the RNLI.
 1866 Silver medal to Watkin Lewis for his part in the rescue of the crew of schooner Rebecca
 1954 Thanks of the Institute inscribed on Vellum to Coxswain Baden P Davies for the rescue of crew from fishing vessel Lindy Lou
 1970 Thanks of the institute inscribed on Vellum to A Blair, M Nichol and K Stone for the rescue of a bather
 1976 Bronze medal to Alan Blair for the rescue of trapped crew of capsized motor cruiser Annabel II
 1978 Framed letter of appreciation to Robert Gorman for the rescue of the crews of two boats
 1985 Letter of appreciation to Helmsman Alan Blair for the rescue of a young bather
 1991 Bronze medals to C-class Helmsman Peter Heading and crew member Robert Gorman, skipper of fishing vessel Seren-y-mor for the rescue of yacht Otters solo crew member. Thanks of the Institution inscribed on Vellum to crew member Michael Harris for his part in the same service. Framed letters of appreciation to David Davies and Martin Porter, lifeboat crew, and Alan Blair, Brian Slack, Bryan Pugh-Jones and Sandro James, members of the Seren-Y-Mor crew. The Ralph Glister Award was awarded to the crew for this service.

Visitor access
This station is classed as an RNLI "Observe" lifeboat station; it welcomes visitors via appointment.

Groups (schools, clubs, organisations) who wish to visit the station can request a tour and presentation via the stations website.

See also
 List of RNLI stations
 Royal National Lifeboat Institution lifeboats

References

External links

 Station website
 Aberystwyth Lifeboat Station on RNLI website

Buildings and structures in Aberystwyth
Lifeboat stations in Wales
Transport infrastructure completed in 1861
1861 establishments in Wales